Bhakra may refer to:

Bhakra Dam
Bhakra, Nepal